Martin Marmgren (born 1975) is a Swedish politician. In 2022, he served as Member of the Riksdag representing the constituency of Stockholm County. He became a member after Karolina Skog left.

References 

Living people
1975 births
Place of birth missing (living people)
21st-century Swedish politicians
Members of the Riksdag from the Green Party
Members of the Riksdag 2018–2022